James M. Wahlberg (born August 19, 1965) is an American film producer and writer.

Early life 
Wahlberg was born in Dorchester, a neighborhood of Boston, to Donald and Alma Elaine Wahlberg. He is the fifth of nine children, with siblings Arthur, Paul, Robert, Tracey, Michelle, Debbie, Donnie, and Mark. As a young person, Jim was in-and-out of juvenile detention centers and became briefly homeless when he was twelve years old. Throughout his teens, Wahlberg struggled with drug and alcohol addiction every day of his life and he lived essentially on his own. Wahlberg's criminal record grew to include arrests for public drunkenness and disorderly conduct which then led to two jail sentences before the age of twenty-two. While in prison after being convicted of armed robbery, Wahlberg found faith in God, and began to end his addiction to alcohol (which he had regularly consumed since he was eight) and drugs (which he had regularly consumed since he was ten). After exiting prison, he became an advocate for individuals suffering from addiction and hoped to help addicts escape the cycle of addiction.

Career

Film and television 

Wahlberg followed suit like brothers Mark and Donnie and entered the film industry through the creation of Wahl St. Productions, a film, television, and web content production company. Wahl St. Productions is credited for films such as The Circle of Addiction: A Different Kind of Tears (2018), If Only (2015), and What About the Kids? (2020). The films showcase the harsh realities of addiction and have featured family members of people who have died of an accidental overdose as extras and actors. What About the Kids? showed the effects of addiction through the lens of a child. Wahlberg's films and documentaries aim to dissolve the stigma of addiction and substance abuse.

Walhberg is also known for being a personality on the A&E show "Wahlburgers" which took a deep dive into the lives and families behind the successful restaurant chain. A special episode featured Wahlberg as he successfully ran the Boston Marathon in tribute to those that lost their lives in the Boston Marathon Bombing a year prior. In 2015, an exclusive Wahlburgers episode aired the Festival of Families celebration in Philadelphia, where Jim and brothers Donnie and Mark met with Pope Francis, thus furthering Wahlberg's relationship with his faith.

Wahlberg is an executive producer of The Lookalike starring Justin Long. He is credited as an executive producer on Wahl Street, a docu-series that aired in 2021 on HBO Max that followed his brother Mark Wahlberg's business interests. Jim was featured on the long-running Christian Broadcasting Network The 700 Club twice.

Writing 

Wahlberg wrote his first book in August 2020, debuting his memoir The Big Hustle: A Boston Street Kid's Story of Addiction and Redemption. The book summarizes the struggles of his drug addiction and the redemption story of his faith. The memoir debuted to praise from critics for its brutal honesty and transparent storytelling and was sold out on Amazon in the first week. Jim Caviezel wrote the foreword to the book.

Personal life 

Wahlberg married long-time girlfriend Bernarda aka Bennie in 1988. The couple live in South Florida and have three children: son Daniel Wahlberg (b.1997) and fraternal twins Jeff and Kyra (b.2001). Son Jeff is an actor and has appeared in films such as Dora and the Lost City of Gold (2019), Cherry (2021), and Future World (2018).

Wahlberg is a devout Catholic; in an interview on The Catholic Talk Show, he gave all praise and credit to Jesus Christ, and the Catholic Church for his life.

Wahlberg is also the host of The Bottom Line, a podcast that highlights the stories of individuals and their struggles and eventual breakthroughs with addiction. The show featured athletes and entertainers such as Darryl Strawberry, Chris Mullins, Brandon Novak, and many more.

Wahlberg has been outspoken about the need for additional recovery and 12 step options during the COVID-19 pandemic. In October 2020, he wrote an opinion piece in USA Today about the dangers of isolation and addiction amid the pandemic. In an interview with Raymond Arroyo for Eternal World Television Network, Wahlberg opens up about his history of crime, abuse, and meeting Mother Teresa while in prison; he states "It was the absolute most defining moment in my life, it's the moment that everything changed for me."

Wahlberg currently serves as the executive director of the Mark Wahlberg Youth Foundation (MWYF) which was created to improve the quality of life for inner-city kids.

Filmography 

The Lookalike
 If Only
 The Circle of Addiction: A Different Kind of Tears
 What About the Kids?
 Wahlburgers
 Wahl Street
 I Played the Giants on a Monday Night
 Toyed
 Instant Gratification
 A Feeling from Within

References

External links 
 

1965 births
Living people
20th-century American criminals
21st-century American male writers
21st-century American memoirists
Activists from Florida
Activists from Massachusetts
American male criminals
American people convicted of robbery
Catholics from Florida
Catholics from Massachusetts
Criminals from Florida
Criminals from Massachusetts
Film directors from Florida
Film directors from Massachusetts
Homeless people
People from Dorchester, Massachusetts
Television producers from Massachusetts
Jim
Writers from Florida
Writers from Massachusetts